The St. Albert Saints were a junior ice hockey franchise based in St. Albert, Alberta, Canada, for twenty-seven seasons from 1977 to 2004. Before 1977, the team played in nearby Spruce Grove as the Spruce Grove Mets, and in 2004 the team again moved to Spruce Grove where they now play as the Spruce Grove Saints. In all its incarnations, the team has been a part of the junior 'A' Alberta Junior Hockey League.

History
The Saints began life as the Edmonton Western Movers, named for the team's sponsor, as one of the original franchises of the Alberta Junior Hockey League in 1963. Nine years later, the Movers merged with their cross-town rivals the Edmonton Maple Leafs (named after the more famous Toronto NHL club) to become the Edmonton Mets as of the 1972–73 season. The team moved to the suburban city of Spruce Grove to become the Spruce Grove Mets as of the 1974–75 season. However, the team's stay in Spruce Grove was short-lived, and before the 1977–78 season the team moved to another Edmonton suburb, St. Albert, where they became the St. Albert Saints.

In Edmonton, the team had already built up its share of history, winning two Carling Cups as the Movers in 1967 and 1968 and adding another two consecutive championships as the Mets in 1975 and 1976, with the 1975 incarnation also taking the national Manitoba Centennial Trophy. But in St. Albert, the team built up most of its most famous alumni and took its share of major championships, although it would never repeat the glory of the 1975 Mets on the national stage.

The Saints won four league titles during their time in St. Albert, taking the 1981, 1982 and 1996 Carling Cups as well as the 1998 Rogers Wireless Cup. But it was its players that achieved the greatest fame, with the most famous undoubtedly being long-time NHLer and six-time Stanley Cup champion Mark Messier, who played one season with the Mets and one with the Saints. Other notable alumni have included longtime New Jersey Devils stalwart Ken Daneyko (who only played two games with the Saints), longtime Chicago Blackhawks player and current Blackhawks WGN-AM radio color analyst Troy Murray, and later NHL standouts such as Steven Reinprecht, Stu Barnes and Mike Comrie. Players such as Fernando Pisani, Steven Goertzen, René Bourque and Jamie Lundmark have had workmanlike careers in the NHL, while other players such as Alexander Fomitchev have gone on to great success in other professional leagues.

Despite these successful players, the Saints were also involved in one of the most tragic incidents in junior hockey history, when a clean hit by a Saints player on Sherwood Park Crusaders forward and captain Trevor Elton resulted in the death of Elton. They were also involved in one of the most violent, a famous bench-clearing brawl on November 21, 1979, between the Saints and the Red Deer Rustlers. This brawl resulted in the suspension of several players, as well as Saints head coach Doug Messier and Rustlers' trainer Terry Sexsmith for getting a little too involved in the battle. Sexsmith was later banned from the AJHL for life. It is reported that Messier had four affiliated Junior B players dressed and hiding in the locker room who then joined the brawl, as planned, soon after it started.

Departure
As the 21st century rolled around, complaints increasingly began to grow that the Saints' arena, Akinsdale Arena, was of a calibre too low to house a junior 'A' franchise. Various newer arenas seating over a thousand, such as the Sherwood Park Crusaders' Sherwood Park Arena, the 2,000-seat Jubilee Recreation Centre, home of the Fort Saskatchewan Traders, and then vacant 1,200-seat Grant Fuhr Arena in Spruce Grove - which was expected to receive a significant upgrade - are all within a short drive of St. Albert. Akinsdale Arena, by comparison, was relatively old and very small, seating only 611 with room for 200 standing, the smallest capacity in the league. The arena also suffered in terms of parking, amenities, and quality of view.

By the 2002-03 season, it was becoming clear that the Saints would be moved, with Barrhead or the oil town of Leduc frequently cited as potential locations. The team was even forced to play out its last games in Edmonton's Bill Hunter Arena, where it never drew crowds of less than double Akinsdale's maximum capacity.

Despite rumours that the St. Albert city council under mayor Richard Plain was to approve the construction of a new multi-use facility including a 1,700-seat arena (one that would eventually be approved for over $40 million in 2004), the Saints moved to Spruce Grove to start the 2004-05 AJHL campaign.

Season-by-season record

Note: GP = Games played, W = Wins, L = Losses, T/OTL = Ties and overtime losses, SOL = Shootout losses Pts = Points, GF = Goals for, GA = Goals against

Playoffs
1971 DNQ
1972 DNQ
1973 DNQ
1974 Lost Semi-final
Red Deer Rustlers defeated Edmonton Mets 4-games-to-none
1975 Won League, Won Alta/BC Championship, Won Abbott Cup, Won 1975 Centennial Cup
Spruce Grove Mets defeated Calgary Canucks 4-games-to-1
Spruce Grove Mets defeated Drumheller Falcons 4-games-to-3 AJHL CHAMPIONS
Spruce Grove Mets defeated Bellingham Blazers (BCJHL) 4-games-to-2 ALTA/BC CHAMPIONS
Spruce Grove Mets defeated Selkirk Steelers (MJHL) 4-games-to-2 ABBOTT CUP CHAMPIONS
Spruce Grove Mets defeated Guelph CMC's (SOJHL) 4-games-to-2 CENTENNIAL CUP CHAMPIONS
1976 Won League, Won Alta/BC Championship, Won Abbott Cup, Lost 1976 Centennial Cup
Spruce Grove Mets defeated Red Deer Rustlers 4-games-to-2
Spruce Grove Mets defeated Taber Golden Suns 4-games-to-none AJHL CHAMPIONS
Spruce Grove Mets defeated Nor'Wes Caps (PJHL) 4-games-to-1 ALTA/BC CHAMPIONS
Spruce Grove Mets defeated Prince Albert Raiders (SJHL) 4-games-to-1 ABBOTT CUP CHAMPIONS
Rockland Nationals (CJHL) defeated Spruce Grove Mets 4-games-to-1
1977 Lost Quarter-final
Taber Golden Suns defeated Spruce Grove Mets 4-games-to-none
1978 Lost Semi-final round robin
St. Albert Saints defeated Red Deer Rustlers 4-games-to-3
Third in semi-final round robin (1-3) vs. Fort Saskatchewan Traders and Calgary Canucks
1979 Lost Semi-final round robin
St. Albert Saints defeated Taber Golden Suns 4-games-to-1
Third in semi-final round robin (2-2) vs. Calgary Canucks and Fort Saskatchewan Traders
1980 Lost Semi-final
St. Albert Saints defeated Fort Saskatchewan Traders 3-games-to-none
Red Deer Rustlers defeated St. Albert Saints 4-games-to-1
1981 Won League, Won Atla/BC Championship, Lost Abbott Cup
St. Albert Saints defeated Red Deer Rustlers 3-games-to-1
St. Albert Saints defeated Sherwood Park Crusaders 4-games-to-2
St. Albert Saints defeated Taber Golden Suns 4-games-to-3 AJHL CHAMPIONS
St. Albert Saints defeated Penticton Knights (BCJHL) 4-games-to-1 ALTA/BC CHAMPIONS
Prince Albert Raiders (SJHL) defeated St. Albert Saints 4-games-to-none
1982 Won League, Won Atla/BC Championship, Lost Abbott Cup
St. Albert Saints defeated Hobbema Hawks 4-games-to-none
St. Albert Saints defeated Fort McMurray Oil Barons 4-games-to-none
St. Albert Saints defeated Calgary Spurs 4-games-to-3 AJHL CHAMPIONS
St. Albert Saints defeated Penticton Knights (BCJHL) 4-games-to-3 ALTA/BC CHAMPIONS
Prince Albert Raiders (SJHL) defeated St. Albert Saints 4-games-to-1
1983 Lost Semi-final
St. Albert Saints defeated Sherwood Park Crusaders 4-games-to-none
Fort McMurray Oil Barons defeated St. Albert Saints 4-games-to-1
1984 Lost Semi-final
St. Albert Saints defeated Sherwood Park Crusaders 4-games-to-3
Fort Saskatchewan Traders defeated St. Albert Saints 4-games-to-3
1985 Lost Quarter-final
Fort Saskatchewan Traders defeated St. Albert Saints 4-games-to-2
1986 Lost Quarter-final
Fort McMurray Oil Barons defeated St. Albert Saints 4-games-to-1
1987 Lost Final
St. Albert Saints defeated Fort McMurray Oil Barons 4-games-to-2
St. Albert Saints defeated Sherwood Park Crusaders 4-games-to-3
Red Deer Rustlers defeated St. Albert Saints 4-games-to-2
1988 Lost Final
St. Albert Saints defeated Fort McMurray Oil Barons 4-games-to-2
St. Albert Saints defeated Hobbema Hawks 4-games-to-2
Calgary Canucks defeated St. Albert Saints 4-games-to-1
1989 Lost Quarter-final
Sherwood Park Crusaders defeated St. Albert Saints 4-games-to-2
1990 Lost Quarter-final
Calgary Canucks defeated St. Albert Saints 4-games-to-3
1991 Lost Quarter-final
Fort McMurray Oil Barons defeated St. Albert Saints 4-games-to-none
1992 Lost Quarter-final
Fort Saskatchewan Traders defeated St. Albert Saints 4-games-to-3
1993 Lost Semi-final
St. Albert Saints defeated Calgary Canucks 5-games-to-2
Fort Saskatchewan Traders defeated St. Albert Saints 4-games-to-3
1994 Lost Semi-final
St. Albert Saints defeated Fort Saskatchewan Traders 4-games-to-3
Olds Grizzlys defeated St. Albert Saints 4-games-to-none
1995 Lost Quarter-final
Sherwood Park Crusaders defeated St. Albert Saints 4-games-to-1
1996 Won League, Lost Doyle Cup
St. Albert Saints defeated Sherwood Park Crusaders 4-games-to-3
St. Albert Saints defeated Olds Grizzlys 4-games-to-none
St. Albert Saints defeated Fort McMurray Oil Barons 4-games-to-3 AJHL CHAMPIONS
Vernon Vipers (BCHL) defeated St. Albert Saints 4-games-to-3
1997 Lost Semi-final
St. Albert Saints defeated Sherwood Park Crusaders 4-games-to-2
Fort McMurray Oil Barons defeated St. Albert Saints 4-games-to-2
1998 Won League, Lost Doyle Cup
St. Albert Saints defeated Olds Grizzlys 4-games-to-2
St. Albert Saints defeated Calgary Canucks 4-games-to-3
St. Albert Saints defeated Fort Saskatchewan Traders 4-games-to-2 AJHL CHAMPIONS
South Surrey Eagles (BCHL) defeated St. Albert Saints 4-games-to-2
1999 Lost Final
St. Albert Saints defeated Grande Prairie Storm 4-games-to-1
St. Albert Saints defeated Lloydminster Blazers 4-games-to-3
Calgary Canucks defeated St. Albert Saints 4-games-to-none
2000 Lost Preliminary
Fort Saskatchewan Traders defeated St. Albert Saints 3-games-to-1
2001 Lost Quarter-final
St. Albert Saints defeated Sherwood Park Crusaders 3-games-to-none
Grande Prairie Storm defeated St. Albert Saints 4-games-to-1
2002 Lost Quarter-final
Grande Prairie Storm defeated St. Albert Saints 4-games-to-2
2003 Lost Final
St. Albert Saints defeated Lloydminster Blazers 4-games-to-1
St. Albert Saints defeated Grande Prairie Storm 4-games-to-1
St. Albert Saints defeated Sherwood Park Crusaders 4-games-to-1
Camrose Kodiaks defeated St. Albert Saints 4-games-to-3
2004 Lost Preliminary
Lloydminster Blazers defeated St. Albert Saints 3-games-to-1

Maple Leafs record

Playoffs
1971 Lost Semi-final
Lethbridge Sugar Kings defeated Edmonton Maple Leafs 4-games-to-none
1972 Lost Semi-final
Calgary Canucks defeated Edmonton Maple Leafs 4-games-to-3

See also
List of ice hockey teams in Alberta

References
AJHL History
AJHL Annual Guide and Record Book 2006-07

Notes

Defunct Alberta Junior Hockey League teams
Defunct ice hockey teams in Alberta
Defunct junior ice hockey teams in Canada
Sport in St. Albert, Alberta
2004 disestablishments in Alberta
Ice hockey clubs disestablished in 2004